The Mathogo (Acronym for Misil Anti-Tanque Hilo Guiado - ) is an Argentine first-generation wire-guided anti-tank missile.

Background 
The anti-tank missiles (ATGW, anti-tank guided weapons) evolved in the late 1950s from the portable anti-tank rockets (ATR) like the bazooka, which required the operator to be close to the target, to overcome the limitations of these.

History 
The Mathogo was developed by CITEFA (Instituto de Investigaciones Científicas y Técnicas de las FFAA - the Armed Forces Scientific and Technical Research Institute) in the 1970s to supplement and eventually replace the Argentine 105-mm recoilless rifles. In design it is similar to the Swedish BANTAM by Bofors - which is reported to have been bought in limited numbers for the Argentine Marine Corps - only slightly larger and with a pointed nose section with the first versions.  Some news report photo captions have even mistaken it for the BANTAM. Development was completed in the late 1970s and various reports have stated that it is no longer in production.

The Mathogo's warhead is capable of penetrating 400mm of rolled homogeneous armor.

The missile achieved operational status in 1978 and is in use by the Argentine Army.  The missile has been approved for launch from the Agusta A109 helicopter, although the missile's accuracy reportedly suffers when used in this role.

Variants 
 Mathogo 1
 Mathogo 2 - improved warhead and higher speed

Users 
 Argentine Army

See also 
 List of anti-tank guided missiles
Related development
 CIBEL-2K
 MARA (anti-tank weapon)
Similar weapons
 Cobra (anti-tank missile)
 Bofors Bantam (missile)
 Nord SS.10 anti-tank missile
 Aerospatiale ENTAC
 Vickers Vigilant

References

Notes

Bibliography 
 (AD) Zarzecki,Thomas. Arms Diffusion: The Spread of Military Innovations in the International System, Psychology Press, 2002.
 (ATW) Norris, John. Anti-tank weapons, London: Brasseys, 1996.
 (JALW) Lennox, Duncan. Jane's Air-Launched Weapons, Coulsdon: Jane's Information Group, 2000.
 (JIW) Hogg, Ian.  Jane's Infantry Weapons 1995-96, London: Jane's Publishing Company Ltd., 1995.
 (JWS) Jane's Weapons Systems 1988-89, London: Jane's Publishing Company Ltd., 1989.

Further reading 
  Cruces, Nestor J. 70 años para siete dias. Planeta, Espejo de la Argentina. Buenos Aires, 1993.  
 Zarzecki,Thomas W. Arms Diffusion: The Spread of Military Innovations in the International System. Psychology Press, Issues in globalization, 2002.

External links 
 CITEFA web site (also in English)
 SAORBATS picture of the missile in its transporter/launcher box
 SAORBATS (unofficial Argentine Army order of battle) Mathogo missile mentioned in the equipment list and its status (site visited 15:33, 22 December 2007 (UTC))

Anti-tank guided missiles of the Cold War
Guided missiles of Argentina
Military equipment introduced in the 1990s